Estola annulata is a species of beetle in the family Cerambycidae. It was described by Johan Christian Fabricius in 1801. It is known from South America.

References

Estola
Beetles described in 1801